Ptilotus schwartzii is a grass-like plant in the Amaranthaceae family.

Distribution
Ptilotus scwartzii is endemic to Australia and found in Western Australia, South Australia, the Northern Territory, and Queensland.

Description
It is perennial herb, which grows from 0.2 to 1 m high, on sand or sandy clay. Its stems are slender, wiry and a dull blue-green in colour. It flowers from March to October with white- pink-purple flowers. It is found near streams on sandplains.

Taxonomy
It was first described in 1888 by Ferdinand von Mueller as Ptilotus fraseri var. schwartzii, who described it from a specimen collected near the McDonnell Ranges by the Reverend Mr Schwartz Ralph Tate raised it to species rank in his 1989 census, with it thereby becoming Ptilotus schwartzii.

References

External links 

 Ptilotus schwartzii occurrence data from the Australasian Virtual Herbarium

scwartzii
Flora of Western Australia
Flora of South Australia
Flora of the Northern Territory
Flora of Queensland
Plants described in 1888
Taxa named by Ferdinand von Mueller